Bromofluoromethane is a mixed gaseous halomethane soluble in alcohol and very soluble in chloroform.

Its standard molar entropy, Sogas is 276.3 J/(mol K) and heat capacity, cp is 49.2 J/(mol K).

Preparation 
Up to date, it has been prepared by three prevailingly ineffective methods:
 From salts of fluoroacetic acid using a Hunsdiecker type of reaction.
 From dibromofluoromethane by reductive debromination with a Swarts reagent.
 From a dihalomethane by an halogen exchange reaction or from a halomethane by catalyzed bromination or fluorination.
The method with the highest yield is reductive debromination of dibromofluoromethane using an organotin hydride.

Uses 
Bromofluoromethane is an important reagent in the manufacture of intermediates, pharmaceuticals and other chemicals. Usage of bromofluoromethane is regulated due to its ozone depletion potential (0.73). Its isotopomer CH2Br18F contains fluorine-18 (18F) and is used in radiochemistry.

Supplier
Valliscor, located in Corvallis, Oregon, specializes in bromofluoromethane production generating purities in the 99.9% or greater range.

References

External sources 
 Determination of the molecular dipole moment of bromofluoromethane
 http://www.valliscor.com/bromofluoromethane

Halomethanes
Organobromides
Organofluorides